No More Night: Live in Birmingham is a live CD/DVD from a Christian singer David Phelps. It was recorded during a presentation at the Alabama Theatre in Birmingham, Alabama in 2006. It was released on September 25, 2007 by Word Records.

Track listing

DVD

 "No Place" - 4:03
 "Long Time Coming" - 3:14
 "My Jesus, I Love Thee" - 3:50
 "Life Is A Church" - 5:12
 "Break Free" - 4:50
 "He Looked Beyond My Fault" - 4:15
 "Revelation" - 4:42
 "Second Fiddle" - 3:57
 "Something's Gotta Change" - 3:33
 "Visions Of God" - 4:59
 "It Is Well" - 3:14
 "That's What Love Is" - 4:55
 "The Love Of God" - 3:37
 "If That Isn't Love" - 5:16
 "No More Night" - 5:23

CD

 "No Place" - 4:03
 "Long Time Coming" - 3:14
 "My Jesus, I Love Thee" - 3:50
 "Life Is A Church" - 5:12
 "Break Free" - 4:50
 "He Looked Beyond My Fault" - 4:15
 "Revelation" - 4:42
 "Second Fiddle" - 3:57
 "Something's Gotta Change" - 3:33
 "Visions Of God" - 4:59
 "It Is Well" - 3:14
 "That's What Love Is" - 4:55
 "The Love Of God" - 3:37
 "If That Isn't Love" - 5:16
 "No More Night" - 5:23

Personnel

Musicians

 Mike Bauer - guitar
 Jack Daniels - keyboards, background vocals
 Adam Nitti - bass
 Will Denton - drums
 Andrea Springall - violin

Background vocals

Background vocals were sung by Lindy Walker, Stephanie B. Watson, Grayson Proctor, Lori Phelps, Allie Arrington, Ali Bloomston, Kate Bowers, Marilyn Gray, Louise Kidd, Catherine Kinney, Riley Logsdon, Callie Phelps, Grant Phelps, Maggie Beth Phelps, Madi Proctor, Sara Anne Stringfellow, Alex Tisdale, Morgan Walston, Savannah Weidman, Linda Adler, Luke Adler, Paul E. Carter, Bonita Conley, Edward E. Crenshaw, Juli Henderson, Sylvia Hollins, A. Jabari Hoyett, Kelly Pittman, Vickie Stokes, John Adam Reed, Jack Daniels, Elizabeth Edwards, Carly Fair, Sherri Proctor, Anthony Evans, and Michael Adler, Summerfest Previews Children's Choir, Carolyn Violi.

Recording and production

 Tre Corley - Audio mixer, editing
 Ralph Anderson - Photographer
 Michael Hanson - Photographer
 David Phelps - Arrangements

Awards

The album received a nomination at the 39th GMA Dove Awards for Long Form Music Video of Year.

References

External links
No More Night: Live in Birmingham on Amazon.com

2007 live albums
2007 video albums
Live video albums
David Phelps albums